Lara is a 2019 German drama film directed by Jan-Ole Gerster.

Plot
The film centres around Lara, a stern civil servant who devotes herself to the career of her piano virtuoso son, Viktor, while abandoning her own creative pursuits.

Cast
 Corinna Harfouch - Lara Jenkins
 Tom Schilling - Viktor Jenkins
 Rainer Bock - Paul Jenkins
 Volkmar Kleinert - Prof. Reinhoffer
 André Jung - Mr. Czerny
 Gudrun Ritter - Lara's mother

Awards
 2019: Karlovy Vary International Film Festival - Crystal Globe/Special Prize of the Jury, Award of Ecumenical Jury, Best Actress - Corinna Harfouch
 2019: Les Arcs European Film Festival - Press Prize
 2019: Filmfest München - FIPRESCI Prize, Best Director (New German Cinema Section)
 2019: Filmkunstwochen Leipzig - Gilde-Filmpreis - Best Film (national)
 2019: Hamptons International Film Festival NY - Narrative Feature - Corinna Harfouch - Best Performance, Golden Starfish Award - Honorable Mention
 2019: Ljubljana International Film Festival - Special Mention Kingfisher Award - Blaz Kutin – Script
 2019: Bavarian Film Price - Best Filmmusic Award - Arash Safaian

References

External links 
 

German drama films
2019 drama films
2019 films
2010s German films